Bane may refer to:

Fictional characters
 Bane (DC Comics), an adversary of Batman
 Bane (Harry Potter), a centaur in the Harry Potter series
 Bane (The Matrix), a character in the Matrix film trilogy
 Bane the Druid, a Guardian in the Legacy of Kain franchise
 Darth Bane, a Sith Lord from the Star Wars franchise
 Cad Bane, famous bounty hunter from the Star Wars franchise
 The Bane, a character in The Underland Chronicles novel series
 Bane, a character in Ten Gentlemen from West Point (1942)

Music
 Bane (band), a hardcore punk band formed in 1995
 Bane, a Joey Arkenstat album produced in 2004 by Mike Gordon
 "Bane", a song by D12 from Shady XV, 2014
 "Bane", a song by alt-J from The Dream, 2022

Places

Africa
 Bane, Nigeria, a village in Nigeria
 Bané Department, one of the 13 departments of the Boulgou Province of Burkina Faso
 Bané, a town in the Bané Department

Asia
 Bane, Iran, a city in Kurdistan Province
 Bane, Lebanon, a village in Bsharri District

Elsewhere
 Bane, West Virginia, an unincorporated community in the United States
 Bane, Velike Lašče, a village in the Municipality of Velike Lašče, southern Slovenia

Other uses
 Bane (plant), an element in the common names of several species of plants, referring to their poisonous nature, whether actual or imagined
 "Bane" (Stargate SG-1), an episode of the television series Stargate SG-1
 Bane people, a Central African ethnicity

People with the name

Given name or nickname
 Bane, a nickname for the Slavic given name Branislav
 Bane Jelic (born 1967), Serbian musician, painter, and writer
 Branislav Kerac (born 1952), Serbian comic book creator
 Branislav Prelević (born 1966), Serbian basketball player
 Branislav Sekulić (1906 – 1968), Serbian football player
 Branislav Trifunović (born 1978), Serbian actor and film producer
 Bane Vasic, American engineer

Surname
 Charles A. Bane (1913 – 1998), American lawyer and civil rights activist
 Charles Bane Jr. (born 1951), American poet
 Cormac Bane, Irish football player
 Desmond Bane, American basketball player
Eddie Bane (born 1952), American baseball player
 Honey Bane (born 1964), English singer and actress
 Howard Bane (1927-2007), American intelligence officer
 James Bane (died 1332), Bishop of St. Andrews
 Jonas Bane (born 1987), Swedish actor
 Jonathan Bane (born 1991), American football player
 Margaret Bane (1542 – 1597), Scottish midwife and alleged witch
 Mary Jo Bane, American political scientist
 Tom Bane (1913 – 1999), American politician

See also 
 Baneh, Iran
 Bain (disambiguation)
 Baine (disambiguation)